The House of Lords Reform Act 2014 is an Act of Parliament of the United Kingdom. The Act was a private member's bill. It received Royal Assent on 14 May 2014. The Act allows members of the House of Lords to retire or resign – actions previously constitutionally impossible for Life Peers. (Under the provisions of the Peerage Act 1963, hereditary peers can effectively resign from the House of Lords by disclaiming their peerage, but this procedure has only been used once since the House of Lords Act 1999 removed automatic membership of hereditary peers in that House.) It also makes provision to exclude members who commit serious criminal offences resulting in a jail sentence of at least one year, and members who fail to attend the House for a whole session. The Act does not have retrospective effect.

, 164 peers have resigned or retired, and a further eight peers were removed under the Act's provisions regarding non-attendance.

Amongst other things, this Act provides for the right of peers to resign from the House of Lords, whilst keeping their title and style. Section 4(5) states that those who have resigned from the Lords can stand or re-stand as MPs. To date, no such person has become an MP.

Peers retired or resigned under the provisions of the Act

Additionally, The Lord Montagu of Beaulieu had given notice of his intention to retire from the Lords on 17 September 2015, having served as an hereditary peer since 7 November 1947; however, he died shortly before his expected retirement date on 31 August 2015.

Peers removed for non-attendance under the provisions of the Act

See also
Reform of the House of Lords (details reform proposals put forward since 1997)
History of reform of the House of Lords (details reforms enacted since the 16th century)
House of Lords Act 1999 (whose provisions were amended by the 2014 Act)
Constitutional Reform and Governance Act 2010 (five Lords resigned through this Act)
House of Lords (Expulsion and Suspension) Act 2015

References
List of Peers who have resigned on www.peerages.info

Notes



United Kingdom Acts of Parliament 2014
Acts of the Parliament of the United Kingdom concerning the House of Lords
Reform in the United Kingdom